The SR 88 (Singapore Rifle 88) is an assault rifle designed and manufactured in Singapore by Chartered Industries of Singapore (CIS, now ST Kinetics).

Development
Following the poor sales of the SAR 80, and with their involvement with the Sterling SAR-87, CIS came up with an improved design – the new SR 88. Many of the parts and mechanisms are similar to its predecessor. Later production models were further improved with higher quality materials including a new handguard and buttstock, this version was designated the SR 88A. 

The SR 88A was built in two versions, the standard model and the latest carbine model which is a heavy-duty mil-spec version with a shorter barrel and a retractable butt-stock popularly called today as the "baby ultimax" because of its overall shorter length and function and frame similarities with the Ultimax 100. Its magazine catch will accept a regular M16 magazine and a C-mag which is also used in M16 rifles.

Design details
It uses long-piston-stroke, gas-operated action with a rotating bolt. The gas piston and gas cylinder are chromium-plated. The gas system features a three position gas regulator – two open positions, for normal and harsh conditions, and one closed for launching of rifle grenades.

The barrel is equipped with flash hider, which also serves as a rifle grenade launcher. The lower receiver is an aluminium forging, and the upper receiver is made from stamped steel.

Furniture (stock, pistol grip, handguards) is made from plastic materials. The standard stock is of fixed type, but the SR 88 is also available with a side-folding stock. The side-folding carrying handle is mounted at the forward end of the receiver.

Variants
SR 88
Standard rifle variant.
SR 88A
Improved variant of above.
SR 88A Carbine
Carbine variant for use by paratroopers.

Users

: Papua New Guinea Defence Force and Royal Papua New Guinea Constabulary with the SR88A.
: Used by Bougainville Revolutionary Army. Captured from Papua New Guinea Defence Force.
: Singapore Armed Forces.
: Slovenian Armed Forces.
: Royal Solomon Islands Police Force

See also
AR-18

References
Notes

Bibliography

5.56×45mm NATO assault rifles
Assault rifles of Singapore
Weapons and ammunition introduced in 1984